Edward Grey,  D.D. (25 March 1782 – 1837) was an Anglican bishop who served in the Church of England as the Bishop of Hereford from 1832 to 1837.

Grey was educated at Christ Church, Oxford. He held livings at St Mary, Whickham and St Botolph Bishopsgate. He was Dean of Hereford from 1830 to 1832; and a Prebendary of Westminster Abbey from 1833.

He was nominated to become Bishop of Hereford by William IV on 4 May 1832 and consecrated as a bishop on 20 May 1832. He died in office in 1837 — on 24 June or 27 June or 24 July. He was a younger son of Charles Grey, 1st Earl Grey; he was therefore entitled, from 1801 onwards, to the style The Honourable.

References

1782 births
1837 deaths
19th-century Church of England bishops
Bishops of Hereford
Edward
Younger sons of earls